Sabre Motorsport is a New Zealand company owned by Dennis Martin that designs and constructs Formula First cars, runs a Motorsport New Zealand Licensed Entrant and Racing School, hires racing cars, and manages a New Zealand Formula First Team.

Dennis Martin
Dennis Martin has been involved with single-seater racing since the 1980s and Sabre Motorsport since 1999. Martin raced both Formula Vee's and Formula Ford's. His Formula Ford was a New Zealand made Valour Type 723.

His Crew are responsible for putting a number of New Zealand drivers into international careers, including Richie Stanaway, Nick Cassidy, Brendon Hartley and Shane van Gisbergen.

In December 2019 Martin was fined $1500 for assaulting a driver at Pukekohe. His driver Matthew McCutcheon had his licence endorsed for the incident by as Martin was considered part of his team.

Sabre Formula First
Sabre Motorsport manufacture a single seat Formula First race car. They sell the cars in kit set, rolling chassis, and ready to race forms.

SpeedSport Scholarship
In the year 2000 Sabre Motorsport joined forces with Speedsport Magazine to create the Speedsport Star of Tomorrow Scholarship. With the demise of SpeedSport Magazine in 2010 the Scholarship Trust have been seeking funds to keep the Scholarship alive via a crowd funding campaign. The winners of the Speedsport Scholarship have been:

 2001 Nic Jordan
 2002 Josh Hart
 2003 Mark Russ
 2004 Shane van Gisbergen
 2005 Andrew Waite
 2006 Alastair Wootten
 2007 Richie Stanaway
 2008 Nick Cassidy
 2009 Aaron Hodgson
 2010 Hayden Pedersen
 2011 Malcolm Finch
 2012 Aaron Marr
 2013 James Webb
 2014 Brooke Reeve
 2015 Liam Lawson
 2016 Dylan Smith
 2017 Conrad Clark
 2018 Ronan Murphy
 2019 Matthew McCutcheon
2020 Dylan Grant 
2021 Jensen Bate

References

External links
 Sabre Motorsport
 Formula First New Zealand

New Zealand auto racing teams

Auto racing teams established in 1999